Samba Para Dos is an album by Argentine composer, pianist and conductor Lalo Schifrin and American trombonist Bob Brookmeyer recorded in 1963 and released on the Verve label.

Reception
The Allmusic review states "Although this may not be considered an essential LP by the average jazz fan, it is well worth acquiring".

Track listing
 "Samba Para Dos" (Lalo Schifrin) - 10:00 
 "What Kind of Fool Am I?" (Leslie Bricusse, Anthony Newley) - 2:58 
 "I Get a Kick Out of You" (Cole Porter) - 4:37 
 "Just One of Those Things" (Porter) - 3:25 
 "Time After Time" (Sammy Cahn, Jule Styne) - 3:28 
 "It's All Right with Me" (Porter) - 2:30 
 "My Funny Valentine" (Lorenz Hart, Richard Rodgers) - 2:00 
 "But Not for Me" (George Gershwin, Ira Gershwin) - 3:05 
Recorded in New York City on February 7, 1963

Personnel
Lalo Schifrin - piano, arranger
Bob Brookmeyer - valve trombone
Frank Rehak - trombone
Leo Wright - alto saxophone, flute
Phil Woods, Jerome Richardson - alto saxophone
Zoot Sims, Al Cohn - tenor saxophone
Romeo Penque - bass clarinet
Danny Bank - baritone saxophone
Jimmy Raney - guitar
Ben Tucker - bass
Dave Bailey - drums
Jose Paulo - percussion
Carmelita Koehler - cello

References

Lalo Schifrin albums
Bob Brookmeyer albums
1963 albums
Albums arranged by Lalo Schifrin
Albums produced by Creed Taylor
Verve Records albums